"Tatararatatá" is a Portuguese-language song written by Cásio Sampaio and released by Brazilian singer Gabriela Moraes.

Maykow & Mandioca
The sertanajo duo Maykow & Mandioca made an adapted version with additional lyrics as "Pedida Perfeita" using the main refrain of "Tatararatatá"

Flavel & Neto version

The track was made popular in European night venues by Brazilian/Cape Verde duo Flavel & Neto who had already become popular with another cover of the Brazilian sertanjo song "Eu quero tchu, eu quero tcha". The duo released it as "Pedida Perfeita (Tararatata)" although the cover of the release used the spelling "Pedida Perfeita (Tattararatata)" instead.

The song became particularly popular in zumba fitness classes and aerobic dance routines. 
The single included two versions of the song, Portuguese language version and the French version (with mixed bilingual French/Portuguese lyrics), the latter becoming a big hit for them in France reaching number 18 in SNEP, the official French Singles Chart. It also appeared in the Ultratip (bubbling under) French Belgian Singles Chart reaching number 11.

The song was included in the debut album of Flavel & Neto. It has been subject to many remixes including a famous version featuring Big Ali.

Track list
"Pedida perfeita (Tararatata)" (French version) (2:52)	
"Pedida perfeita (Tararatata)" (Portuguese version) (2:52)

Charts
Flavel & Neto version

References

External links
Gabriela Moraes

2012 singles
2013 singles
Flavel & Neto songs
Macaronic songs
2012 songs